Mike W. Miller (born August 7, 1951) is an American businessman and politician.

Early life and education 
Born in Fairbanks, Alaska, Miller went to Monroe Catholic High School and the University of Alaska Fairbanks.

Career 
Miller served in the Alaska Air National Guard. He was the owner and manager of Santa Claus House in North Pole, Alaska. Miller served on the North Pole City Council from 1976 to 1980 as a Republican. From 1983 to 1993, Miller served in the Alaska House of Representatives. He then served in the Alaska Senate from 1993 to 2001 and was president of the senate in 1997 and 1998.

Miller ran for United States Senate in 2004, but lost the Republican primary to Lisa Murkowski.

References

1951 births
Living people
Politicians from Fairbanks, Alaska
University of Alaska Fairbanks alumni
Businesspeople from Fairbanks, Alaska
Alaska city council members
Republican Party Alaska state senators
Republican Party members of the Alaska House of Representatives
Presidents of the Alaska Senate